Ankiliabo is a town and commune in southwestern Madagascar. It belongs to the district of Ampanihy, which is a part of Atsimo-Andrefana Region. The population of the commune was estimated to be approximately 9,000 in 2001 commune census.

Only primary schooling is available. Farming and raising livestock provides employment for 35% and 60% of the working population.  The most important crops are cassava and chickpea; also maize is an important agricultural product. Industry and services provide employment for 1% and 4% of the population, respectively.

References and notes 

Populated places in Atsimo-Andrefana